Tomás Mejías Osorio (born 30 January 1989) is a Spanish professional footballer who plays as a goalkeeper for AD Ceuta FC.

Club career

Real Madrid
Mejías was born in Madrid. In 2001, aged 12, he joined local Real Madrid's youth academy from neighbouring amateurs CD Coslada. He made his debut with the reserves in the 2007–08 season, playing five games for them in Segunda División B.

As first-team manager José Mourinho decided to rest Iker Casillas, Mejías was selected for a La Liga home match against Getafe CF on 10 May 2011. He replaced another club youth graduate, Antonio Adán, for the last ten minutes of a 4–0 home win.

Mejías was selected in a 20-man squad for the first match of the 2011–12 campaign, away to Real Zaragoza, but eventually did not make the bench. He contributed 26 appearances the following year, as the B's retained their Segunda División status.

Middlesbrough
On 11 February 2014, Mejías joined Championship club Middlesbrough on loan until the end of the season. He made his debut on 1 March, in a 1–0 away loss against Sheffield Wednesday. It was his only appearance during the time of his loan, as he dislocated a finger in training and was sidelined for the rest of the campaign.

The deal was made permanent on 4 July 2014, and Mejías signed a two-year contract. On 28 October of the following year, he saved from Wayne Rooney and Ashley Young as his team won in a penalty shoot-out away to Manchester United in the fourth round of the League Cup, also keeping a clean sheet for 120 minutes.

On 5 January 2017, Mejías was loaned to Rayo Vallecano until the end of the Spanish second-tier season. At the end of the following campaign, he was released by Middlesbrough.

Omonia
Mejías signed for Cypriot First Division club AC Omonia on 10 July 2018. He played 29 matches in all competitions in his only season, where his team finished sixth in the domestic league.

Return to Middlesbrough
Mejías returned to Middlesbrough on 4 July 2019, agreeing to a two-year deal. In September 2020, he was loaned to FC Dinamo București of the Romanian Liga I.

Later career
Mejías joined Turkish TFF First League side Ankaraspor in January 2021. He switched teams and countries again in October, signing for Western Sydney Wanderers FC in the Australian A-League.

On 4 January 2023, Mejías returned to Spain six years after leaving, agreeing to a contract at Primera Federación club AD Ceuta FC.

Career statistics

Honours
Real Madrid Castilla
Segunda División B: 2011–12

Spain U20
Mediterranean Games: 2009

References

External links

1989 births
Living people
Spanish footballers
Footballers from Madrid
Association football goalkeepers
La Liga players
Segunda División players
Segunda División B players
Tercera División players
Primera Federación players
Real Madrid C footballers
Real Madrid Castilla footballers
Real Madrid CF players
Rayo Vallecano players
AD Ceuta FC players
English Football League players
Middlesbrough F.C. players
Cypriot First Division players
AC Omonia players
Liga I players
FC Dinamo București players
TFF First League players
Ankaraspor footballers
A-League Men players
Western Sydney Wanderers FC players
Spain youth international footballers
Competitors at the 2009 Mediterranean Games
Mediterranean Games medalists in football
Mediterranean Games gold medalists for Spain
Spanish expatriate footballers
Expatriate footballers in England
Expatriate footballers in Cyprus
Expatriate footballers in Romania
Expatriate footballers in Turkey
Expatriate soccer players in Australia
Spanish expatriate sportspeople in England
Spanish expatriate sportspeople in Cyprus
Spanish expatriate sportspeople in Romania
Spanish expatriate sportspeople in Turkey
Spanish expatriate sportspeople in Australia